Structural maintenance of chromosomes protein 3 (SMC3) is a protein that in humans is encoded by the SMC3 gene. SMC3 is a subunit of the Cohesin complex which mediates sister chromatid cohesion, homologous recombination and DNA looping. Cohesin is formed of SMC3, SMC1, RAD21 and either SA1 or SA2. In humans, SMC3 is present in all cohesin complexes whereas there are multiple paralogs for the other subunits.

SMC3 is a member of the  SMC protein family. Members of this family are key regulators of DNA repair, chromosome condensation and chromosome segregation.

Structure and interactions 

The domain organisation of SMC proteins is evolutionarily conserved and is composed of an N-terminal Walker A motif, coiled-coil, "hinge", coiled-coil and a C-terminal Walker B motif. The protein folds back on itself to form a rod-shaped molecule with a heterodimerisation "hinge" domain at one end  and an ABC-type ATPase "head" at the other. These globular domains are separated by a ~50 nm anti-parallel coiled-coil. SMC3 and SMC1 bind via their hinge domains creating V-shaped heterodimers. The N-terminal domain of RAD21 binds to the coiled coil of SMC3 just above the head domain while the C-terminal domain of RAD21 binds the head domain of SMC1. This end to end binding of the SMC3-SMC1-RAD21 trimer creates a closed ring within which DNA can be entrapped. SA1 or 

When DNA is replicated and sister chromatid cohesion is established SMC3 is acetylated on a pair of highly conserved lysines by ESCO1 and ESCO2. In budding yeast this modification is sufficient to stabilise cohesin on the DNA until mitosis but in animals, binding of sororin is also required.

During meiosis, SMC3 forms cohesin complexes with SMC1ß, STAG3 and REC8 which generate cohesion between homologous chromosomes and sister chromatids.

Cornelia de Lange syndrome 

Cornelia de Lange syndrome (CdLS) is a rare genetic disorder that presents with variable clinical abnormalities including dysmorphic features, severe growth retardation, global developmental delay, and intellectual disability.  SMC3 is one of five genes that have been implicated in CdLS.  In one case report, a novel SMC3 gene duplication was detected in a child with failure to thrive, hypotonia and facial dysmorphic features of CdLS.  The same duplication was also observed in the mother, who had milder dysmorphic facies.

Mouse Model

Model organisms have been used in the study of SMC3 function. A conditional knockout mouse line, called Smc3tm1a(EUCOMM)Wtsi was generated as part of the International Knockout Mouse Consortium program — a high-throughput mutagenesis project to generate and distribute animal models of disease to interested scientists.

Male and female animals underwent a standardized phenotypic screen to determine the effects of deletion. Twenty two tests were carried out on mutant mice and six significant abnormalities were observed. No homozygous mutant embryos were identified during gestation, and thus none survived until weaning. The remaining tests were carried out on heterozygous mutant adult mice. Females had a higher than normal incidence of pre-wean death in their offspring, and also had a decreased body weight. Males heterozygotes displayed a shortened, upturned snout.

Role in Basement Membrane 

SMC3 occurs in certain cell types as a secreted protein and post-translational addition of chondroitin sulfate chains gives rise to the secreted proteoglycan bamacan, an abundant basement membrane protein.

References

External links 
  GeneReviews/NCBI/UW/NIH entry on Cornelia de Lange syndrome
 

Human proteins
Genes mutated in mice